

1909–10 season

Schedule and results

1910–11 season

Schedule and results

1911–12 season

Schedule and results

1912–13 season

Schedule and results

1913–14 season

Schedule and results

1914–15 season

Schedule and results

1915–16 season

Schedule and results

1916–17 season

Schedule and results

1917–18 season

Schedule and results

1918–19 season

Schedule and results

References

1910